Raphitoma skylla is a species of sea snail, a marine gastropod mollusk in the family Raphitomidae.

Description
The length of the shell attains 9.6 mm.

Distribution
This marine species occurs in the Mediterranean Sea off the  Lipari Islands, Italy

References

 Pusateri F., Giannuzzi-Savelli R. & Oliverio M. 2012. A revision of the Mediterranean Raphitominae 1: On the sibling species Raphitoma contigua (Monterosato, 1884) and Raphitoma spadiana n. sp. (Gastropoda, Conoidea). Iberus, 30(1): 41-52

External links
 Biolib.cz: Raphitoma skylla

spadiana
Gastropods described in 2018